Ole André Myhrvold  (born 10 June 1978) is a Norwegian politician. He was elected as a representative to Norway's Storting legislature for the period 2017–2021 for the Centre Party. He is a member of the Standing Committee on Energy and the Environment.

Myhrvold was mayor of Trøgstad from 2011 to 2017.

References

1978 births
Living people
Centre Party (Norway) politicians
Members of the Storting
Østfold politicians
Mayors of places in Norway